Fillip Rodrigues da Silva (born 23 November 1981) is a Brazilian footballer.

Before returning to Brazil in 2011, he played for several Greek clubs for six years.

References

1983 births
Living people
Brazilian footballers
Associação Desportiva Cabofriense players
A.O. Kerkyra players
PAS Giannina F.C. players
APOP Kinyras FC players
América Futebol Clube (RN) players
Botafogo Futebol Clube (SP) players
Thrasyvoulos F.C. players
Kallithea F.C. players
Cypriot First Division players
Brazilian expatriate footballers
Expatriate footballers in Greece
Expatriate footballers in Cyprus
Association football midfielders